Francisco Figueroa (born 21 July 1906, date of death unknown) was a Uruguayan water polo player. He competed in the men's tournament at the 1936 Summer Olympics.

References

1906 births
Year of death missing
Uruguayan male water polo players
Olympic water polo players of Uruguay
Water polo players at the 1936 Summer Olympics
Sportspeople from Montevideo